Justas is a Lithuanian masculine given name. Notable people with the name include:

 Justas Paleckis (1899–1980), Lithuanian journalist and politician
 Justas Vincas Paleckis (born 1942), Lithuanian ex-communist and politician, diplomat
 Justas Sinica (born 1985), Lithuanian basketball player
 Justas Tamulis (born 1994), Lithuanian basketball player

See also
 Las Justas, an intercollegiate sports event held yearly in Puerto Rico
 Justa (disambiguation)

References

Masculine given names
Lithuanian masculine given names